The Hong Kong Museum of History is a museum that preserves Hong Kong's historical and cultural heritage. It is located next to the Hong Kong Science Museum, in Tsim Sha Tsui East, Kowloon, Hong Kong.

The collections of the museum encompass natural history, archaeology, ethnography and local history.

History

The museum was established by the Urban Council in July 1975 when the City Museum and Art Gallery was split into the Hong Kong Museum of History and Hong Kong Museum of Art; some of the Museum of History's collections were on display at the City Museum and Art Gallery's original 1962 location at the City Hall.

From 1975 to 1983, the Hong Kong Museum of History was housed in a 700 m2 rented space within Star House. In 1983, the Museum was moved to a temporary location (which now houses Hong Kong Heritage Discovery Centre) in Kowloon Park. It was moved to its present premises near Hong Kong Science Museum on Chatham Road South, Tsim Sha Tsui in 1998. It is currently managed by the Leisure and Cultural Services Department of Hong Kong Government.

The Hong Kong Story
The Hong Kong Story permanent exhibition is a showcase of the history and development of Hong Kong. Occupying an area of 7,000 m2, The Hong Kong Story comprises eight galleries located on two floors. Through the display of over 4,000 exhibits with the use of 750 graphic panels, a number of dioramas and multi-media programmes, and enhanced with special audio-visual and lighting effects, The Hong Kong Story outlines the natural environment, folk culture, and historical development of Hong Kong. The exhibition starts from the Devonian period 400 million years ago and concludes with the Handover of Hong Kong in 1997. The museum exhibits prehistoric fossils, colonial documents from the 19th Century and Ancient Chinese pottery

Branch museums
The museum runs five branch museums: Hong Kong Museum of Coastal Defence at Shau Kei Wan, Lei Cheng Uk Han Tomb Museum at Sham Shui Po, and Law Uk Folk Museum at Chai Wan, Fireboat Alexander Grantham Exhibition Gallery inside the Quarry Bay Park and Dr. Sun Yat-sen Museum at Mid-Levels in Central.

Public transport
The museum is accessible within walking distance West from Hung Hom station of MTR.

See also
Government Records Service
Heritage conservation in Hong Kong
History of Hong Kong
Hong Kong Archaeological Society
Hong Kong Heritage Museum
List of buildings and structures in Hong Kong
List of museums in Hong Kong

References

Further reading

External links

Hong Kong Museum of History
e-book

1975 establishments in Hong Kong
History museums in Hong Kong
History of Hong Kong
Museums established in 1975
Tsim Sha Tsui East